Henry Ware Eliot (November 25, 1843 – January 7, 1919) was an American industrialist and philanthropist who lived in St. Louis, Missouri. He was the father of poet T. S. Eliot.

Early life and education
He was the son of Abigail Adams (Cranch) and William Greenleaf Eliot, a prominent St. Louis Unitarian minister who was a co-founder of Washington University.  Eliot graduated from Washington University, A.B. 1863. Henry Eliot remained a Unitarian all his life.  Henry was named in honor of Henry Ware Jr., a prominent leader of Harvard Divinity School and mentor of Henry Eliot's father in seminary.

Career
Eliot first worked at Reed and Green in the wholesale grocery business.  Next he became a partner in the firm of Eliot and Larkin as manufacturing chemists. 

In 1874 Eliot became Secretary of the Hydraulic-Press Brick Company in St. Louis, later serving in all offices including President, until his retirement at age 70.  He continued to aid the company with his judgment and experience.

Public life
He served on the Board of Directors of Washington University, 1877–1919; as President of the Academy of Science, St. Louis, 1902; and Trustee of the Missouri Botanical Garden, 1902-1903.  

In later life he compiled a record of the descendants of his ancestor William Greenleaf (1724–1803).

Marriage and family life
On October 27, 1868 at Lexington, Massachusetts Eliot married Charlotte Champe Stearns. They were the parents of two sons and five daughters: Ada (Eliot) Sheffield; Margaret Dawes Eliot; Charlotte (Eliot) Smith; Marian Cushing Eliot; Henry Ware Eliot Jr.; Theodora Sterling Eliot and the poet Thomas Stearns Eliot.

Eliot died in St. Louis in 1919 and was buried at Bellefontaine Cemetery.  A tombstone provides information about both him and his wife.

External links
 

American manufacturing businesspeople
American philanthropists
American Unitarians
Washington University in St. Louis alumni
Businesspeople from St. Louis
1843 births
1919 deaths
Eliot family (America)
Missouri Botanical Garden people

19th-century American businesspeople